The Venetian is a 1931 historical play by Clifford Bax about the Medici family.

It ran for 86 performances in the West End, first at the Little Theatre before transferring to The Apollo. The cast included John Clements, Alastair Sim as Cardinal Ferdinando de Medici, Catherine Lacey and Ivan Brandt.

References

Bibliography
 Wearing, J.P. The London Stage 1930-1939: A Calendar of Productions, Performers, and Personnel.  Rowman & Littlefield, 2014.

1931 plays
Plays by Clifford Bax
West End plays
Plays set in Italy
Historical plays